The thirteenth season of Ich bin ein Star – Holt mich hier raus!, the German version of the reality television show I'm a Celebrity...Get Me Out of Here!, began on 11 January 2019, and was broadcast till 26 January 2019, on RTL Television.

Sonja Zietlow and Daniel Hartwich were the hosts as in the years 2013 to 2018. Also the paramedic Bob McCarron alias "Dr. Bob" was back.

Contestants

Results and elimination
 Indicates that the celebrity received the most votes from the public
 Indicates that the celebrity received the fewest votes and was eliminated immediately (no bottom two)
 Indicates that the celebrity was in the bottom two of the public vote

On day 14 none of the celebrities were eliminated because of technical issues. The votes were counted for day 15. On day 15 the celebrity with the fewest votes from the day before was eliminated at the start of the show and at the end two other celebrities were eliminated.

Bushtucker Trials

Result table: Who Should go to the Bushtucker Trials?

Statistics

Ratings

References

External links
 

2019 German television seasons
13